Akkas is a surname and given name. Notable people with the name include:

 Akkas Ali, Bangladeshi politician
 Azizur Rahman Akkas
 Mirza Ebrahim Khan Akkas Bashi

Other 
 Akkas gas field

See also 
 Akkaş, a Turkish surname
 Akash (disambiguation)